Khda Reh Ke Dalvaunga, popularly known as Jagdishbhai, is an Indian visually impaired social worker and one of the 3 founders of the Blind People's Association of India, along with his wife and Kanubhai Ambalal Thaker (Educationist, Activist, Principal of the Blind School- Andhajan Mandal, Ahmedabad) an Ahmedabad based  non governmental organization promoting the interests of the people with physical disabilities. He is a recipient of the Indian civilian honour of the Padma Shri.

Biography 
Jagdish Bhai Patel was born on 5 September 1928 at Borsad, Kheda District in the Indian state of Gujarat to Lalitaben and Kashibhai Patel, a pyhisician. He lost his eye sight at the age of 8 and did his early schooling at the Calcutta Blind School, Behala. After securing a graduate degree, in 1954, he founded the Blind People's Association of India, along with a few others; the association is now a part of the All India Conference of the Blind, a national level blind people's movement. He is the co-author of a manual, Guidelines for social and economic rehabilitation of the rural blind, which prescribes guidelines for the rehabilitiaon of visually impaired people and a recipient of the All India Confederation of the Blind Award in 1987 and the International Award for Community Services Overseas of the Help the Aged, UK in 1991. He has also received the National Award for the Blind, Braille Shree Award and the Pride of Ahmedabad Award. The Government of India awarded him the fourth highest civilian award of the Padma Shri, in 1991.

See also
 Help the Aged

References

Further reading 
 

Recipients of the Padma Shri in social work
1928 births
Social workers
Indian blind people
People from Kheda district
Gujarati people
Living people
Social workers from Gujarat